CERN Courier (or sometimes CERN Courier: International Journal of High Energy Physics) is a monthly trade magazine covering current developments in high-energy physics and related fields worldwide. It was established in 1959. Since October 1998 the magazine has been published by IOP Publishing on behalf of CERN. Up to volume 45 no. 5 (2005) the magazine was published both in English and French. The French edition was published under the title Courrier CERN : Revue internationale de la physique des hautes énergies. Currently it is a single-language edition where articles are published either in French or English with an abstract in the other language, although most articles are in English. CERN Courier is distributed to member-state governments, institutes and laboratories affiliated with CERN, and to their personnel. It is published monthly, except for January and August. The views expressed are not necessarily those of the CERN management.

The first editor, Roger Anthoine, started CERN Courier with an initial print run of 1000, and by the time he had to put it on hold, little more than a year later, the number had already risen to 3000. In 2015 some 21,000 copies are printed 10 times a year and the journal has a massive readership online. Over the years, particularly with the advent of the CERN Bulletin in 1965, CERN Courier evolved from being a house publication to become a scientific journal. The Courier thus became the ambassador of CERN and particle physics to a large community of knowledgeable specialists and inquisitive people, having been rebranded in 1974 with the subtitle International Journal of High-Energy Physics.

In addition to news and events, CERN Courier will often present cover pieces on influential physicists or retrospectives of significant historical moments in high-energy-physics history. Book reviews, white papers, obituaries, and product releases are also featured in the magazine.

The CERN Courier has been published regularly since the start, apart from the period April 1960 to January 1962 when the magazine "hibernated" owing to unfortunate circumstances. 
The magazine has been edited by the following editors:
 Roger Anthoine (1959–1961)
 Alec Hester (1962–1965) 
 Brian Southworth (1966–1985)
 Together with Gordon Fraser (from 1977, volume 17, no. 4), Henri-Luc Felder (French edition from 1973, volume 13, no. 4)
 Gordon Fraser (1986–2001)
 Together with Brian Southworth (until 1990, volume 30, no. 4) and Henri-Luc Felder (French edition until 1992, volume 32, no. 8)
 James Gillies (2002–2003)
The first issue in 2003 was co-edited with Christine Sutton
 Christine Sutton (2003–2015)
 Christine Sutton handed over to the next editor as of no. 9, 2015 
 Antonella Del Rosso (2015–2016)
 Antonella Del Rosso was editor from no.9 2015 to no. 5 2016 
 Matthew Donald Chalmers (2016– )
 Matthew Chalmers has been the editor since no. 6 2016.

References

External links
 
 Digitised issues both in English and French from the CERN Library

CERN
Professional and trade magazines
English-language magazines
Magazines established in 1959
Monthly magazines published in the United Kingdom